Caprinia castanealis is a species of moth of the family Crambidae. It is found in Papua New Guinea.

It has a wingspan of 36mm.

References

External links

Spilomelinae
Moths described in 1907